Alf Chown (born 28 April 1932) is a former Australian rules footballer who played for the Hawthorn Football Club in the Victorian Football League (VFL).

Notes

External links 

Living people
1932 births
Australian rules footballers from Victoria (Australia)
Hawthorn Football Club players
Sale Football Club players